Julien Kang (born 11 April 1982) is a Canadian television actor and model.

In May 2012, Kang starred opposite Ryu Si-won as Kang Gu-ra, a rival fighter to Ryu's Seung-hyuk in Channel A's Goodbye Dear Wife.

Early life
Kang was born in Saint Pierre and Miquelon, an overseas French territory off the coast of Newfoundland, Canada, to a  Korean father and a French mother. He is the younger brother of mixed martial artist Denis Kang.

Other activities

On 18 August 2012, Kang was paired with South Korean actress Yoon Se-ah, beginning the transition between season 3 and season 4 of We Got Married. The virtual couple dubbed KangYoon couple and Juliah couple by fans, moved into House #1 in the new We Got Married Village. Kang was elected as Chief of the WGM Village by the current couples.

In August 2015, Kang signed with Jellyfish Entertainment.

Filmography

Film

Television series

Variety show

Reality show

Music video appearances

References

External links

1982 births
Living people
French male models
French male television actors
French people of Korean descent
Male actors of Korean descent
Jellyfish Entertainment artists
South Korean male television actors
People from Saint Pierre and Miquelon